Aaron John Sharp (July 29, 1904 – November 16, 1997), known professionally as Jack Sharp, was an American botanist and bryologist, considered an expert on mosses.

Early life
Sharp was raised on a dairy farm near East Liberty, Ohio. He attended Ohio Wesleyan University and earned his degree in botany in 1927. After receiving his undergraduate degree, Sharp was introduced to bryology by George Elwood Nichols while taking his classes at the University of Michigan Biological Station. Sharp earned his M.S. from the University of Oklahoma while studying under Paul Sears in 1929.

Career
In 1929, Sharp moved to Knoxville, Tennessee and began teaching at the University of Tennessee. Although he was accepted into the Ph.D program at Yale University, financial troubles led him to complete his doctorate at Ohio State University in 1938. Sharp became a full professor at the University of Tennessee in 1946, and between 1951 and 1961, he was head of the Department of Botany. 

Sharp served as president of the Botanical Society of America in 1965. He retired from the University of Tennessee in 1974 but remained as an emeritus professor. Sharp was made Fellow of the Linnean Society in 1992.

Legacy
Two genera of moss were named in his honor; Neosharpiella in the family Bartramiaceae in 1973, and Unclejackia (in family Brachytheciaceae) by Daniel H. Norris in 1999.
A species of shrub, Magnolia sharpii was also named by Dr. Faustino Miranda in 1955.

Two awards bear his name; The Sharp Fund is a monetary award at the University of Tennessee for floristic studies in plants, and The Sharp Award of the American Bryological and Lichenological Society is presented to the best student paper at each annual meeting.

Awards
Fellow of the American Association for the Advancement of Science, 1944
Guggenheim Fellow, 1944–1946
Honorary Doctorate of Science, Ohio Wesleyan University, 1952
Merit Award of the Botanical Society of America, 1973
Distinguished Professor Emeritus, University of Tennessee, 1974 
Elizabeth Ann Bartholomew Award, Southern Appalachian Botanical Society, 1989
Order of the Rising Sun (3rd class), Japan, 1990
Distinguished Service Award, Tennessee Environmental Education Association, 1991 
Fellow of the Linnean Society, 1992
Distinguished Achievement Citation, Ohio Wesleyan University, 1993
Eloise Payne Luguer Medal, Garden Club of America, 1993

Selected publications

Sharp, A. J.; H. Crum; P. M. Eckel, eds. (1994). Moss Flora of Mexico. Memoirs of the New York Botanical Garden 69, vols. 1–2.

References

External links

Bryologists
1904 births
1997 deaths
Fellows of the American Association for the Advancement of Science
Fellows of the Linnean Society of London
University of Tennessee faculty
Recipients of the Order of the Rising Sun, 3rd class
20th-century American botanists